Casanova in Burlesque is a 1944 American comedy film directed by Leslie Goodwins and written by Frank Gill Jr.. The film stars Joe E. Brown, June Havoc, Dale Evans, Marjorie Gateson, Lucien Littlefield and Ian Keith. The film was released on February 29, 1944, by Republic Pictures.

Plot

A stripper discovers that a professor spends summer teaching Shakespeare and winter as a burlesque comic.

Cast  
Joe E. Brown as Joseph M. Kelly Jr.
June Havoc as Lillian Colman
Dale Evans as Barbara Compton
Marjorie Gateson as Lucille Compton
Lucien Littlefield as John Alden Compton
Ian Keith as J. Boggs-Robinson
Roger Imhof as Joseph M. Kelly Sr.
Harry Tyler as Bucky Farrell
Patricia Knox as Peewee Dixon
Sugar Geise as Fannie
Jerry Frank as Al Gordon 
Margia Dean as Burlesque Queen

See also
List of American films of 1944

References

External links
 

1944 films
American comedy films
1944 comedy films
Republic Pictures films
Films directed by Leslie Goodwins
American black-and-white films
1940s English-language films
1940s American films